The Sheep Pen Sandstone is a late Triassic geologic formation exposed in northeastern New Mexico. Fossil theropod tracks have been reported from the formation.

Description
It with a slight angular unconformity on the Sloan Canyon Formation and is overlain unconformably by the Exeter Sandstone.

The formation is usually assigned to the Dockum Group. The proposal of Spencer G. Lucas and his collaborators to abandon the Dockum Group, possibly in favor of the Chinle Group, is highly controversial.

Fossils
The lower site includes the invertebrates Scoyenia and the dinosauroid Grallator on a scour surface. The traces are numerous but of low diversity. The middle site has at least ten distinct trackways, eight of Grallator and two of Brachychirotherium. The upper site has well-preserved tracks of Grallator and some poorly preserved tracks, possibly of Brachychirotherium. The tracks suggest a stable ecosystem with low diversity, which may be typical of the middle Norian.

Economic geology
The formation has some copper mineralization around the western Oklahoma panhandle. Some 200 mines were in operation from 1884 to 1925. but these likely produced less than 10,000 tons of ore. The ore took the form of chalcocite, malachite, and azurite, deposited both in lenticular beds and in clastic plugs.

History of investigation
The formation was first named by B.H. Parker in 1930.

See also

 List of fossiliferous stratigraphic units in Colorado
 Paleontology in Colorado

References

Sandstone formations of the United States
Triassic formations of New Mexico